Laurent Bocquet was a French dancer, choreographer and ballet master of the 18th century.

A dancer in Turin in 1762, he became ballet master at Théâtre de la Monnaie of Brussels from 1772 to 1777. He replaced Antoine Pitrot in the course of the season and, on January 27, 1772, he gave his first ballet: Le Triomphe de l'Amour et des Grâces. We also owe him Le Port de Londres (8 September 1773) and Les Hussards (20 October 1773).

During the season 1776–1777, he gave another eight ballets and shared his job with Auguste Fisse.

The contract concluded on February 17, 1772 with the directors of the theatre Ignaz Vitzthumb and Louis Compain specified that Bocquet was engaged as ballet master, as well as "to educate and train those we destine to figure and to sing in the opera the roles which will be judged to suit him, and in the comedy of accessories."

External links 
 Laurent Bocquet on César

18th-century French dancers
French choreographers
French ballet masters
French male ballet dancers